iTunes Originals: Yeah Yeah Yeahs is a compilation album by American indie rock band Yeah Yeah Yeahs, released exclusively through the iTunes Store on October 20, 2009, as part of the iTunes Originals series. The album consists of both acoustic versions and original studio recordings of the band's songs, as well as interview tracks.

Track listing

Release history

References

2009 compilation albums
DGC Records albums
Interscope Records compilation albums
Yeah Yeah Yeahs
Yeah Yeah Yeahs albums